Brian Patrick Shinners (born 6 August 1949) is a former Australian rules footballer who played with Richmond and Hawthorn in the Victorian Football League (VFL)	and with Dandenong in the Victorian Football Association (VFA).

Notes

External links 

		
Brian Shinners's playing statistics from The VFA Project

Living people
1949 births
Australian rules footballers from Victoria (Australia)
Richmond Football Club players
Hawthorn Football Club players
Dandenong Football Club players